The 2014 Florida Tarpons season was the third season for the franchise as a member of the Ultimate Indoor Football League (UIFL).

Schedule
Key:

Regular season
All start times are local to home team

Postseason

Standings

y - clinched conference title
x - clinched playoff spot

Roster

References

Florida Tarpons
Florida Tarpons
Florida Tarpons